Jerónimo Tomás Abreu Herrera (September 30, 1930 – June 27, 2012) was the Catholic bishop of the Diocese of Mao-Monte-Cristi, Dominican Republic.

Ordained to the priesthood in 1955, Abreu Herrera was named bishop in 1978 and retired in 2006.

See also
Catholic Church in the Dominican Republic

Notes

21st-century Roman Catholic bishops in the Dominican Republic
1930 births
2012 deaths
20th-century Roman Catholic bishops in the Dominican Republic
Roman Catholic bishops of Mao-Monte Cristi
White Dominicans